Kangaslampi is a suburb (lähiö) in the Huhtasuo district of Jyväskylä, Finland. It is located about six kilometers to the northeast from the city center. The area has a convenience store and many services nearby. The suburb was mostly built during the 1970s.

Kangaslampi has a big number of immigrants compared to the other areas in Jyväskylä.

Kangaslampi is also the name of the pond in the area.

Gallery

References

External links 
 Kiinteisömaailma (in Finnish).
 SKV (in Finnish).

Neighbourhoods of Jyväskylä